Peyrutabad (also Romanized as Peyrūtābād) is a village in Oshnavieh-ye Shomali Rural District, in the Central District of Oshnavieh County, West Azerbaijan Province, Iran. At the 2006 census, its population was 209, in 29 families.

References 

Populated places in Oshnavieh County